Anthony or Anthonij Colve (fl. 1667-1695) was a Dutch naval captain and the Director-General of New Netherland during a brief restoration of Dutch rule in New Netherland (roughly present-day New York and New Jersey).

Career
Colve was likely involved in the recapture of Suriname from the British by a Zeeland squadron led by Abraham Crijnssen in March 1667. Upon his return in 1668, he was an officer cadet (vaandrig) in  until 1670, when he became a captain at Fort Lillo. In 1672, he moved with his troops to Veere.

Colve was commissioned when the Netherlands retook New York City during the Third Anglo-Dutch War after nine years of British rule. He began his administration on September 19, 1673, and it ended on February 9, 1674, when English rule was restored under the terms of the Treaty of Westminster. New York was renamed New Orange under his administration.

Upon his return to the Dutch Republic he was a sergeant-major under Caspar de Mauregnault in 1679 and lieutenant-colonel under Jacques-Louis Comte de Noyelles in 1683. He was last reported as a commandeur of Veere in 1695.

Personal life
Colve married Margarethe "Griton" de Quade. Two daughters and a son are known of this marriage. His son Jacob Lambert Colve (died 1723) was mayor of Veere and a member of the States of Zeeland from 1717 to 1722.

See also
New Netherland
Director of New Netherland
List of colonial governors of New York
List of colonial governors of New Jersey

References

Year of birth missing
Year of death missing
17th-century Dutch people
Dutch naval personnel of the Anglo-Dutch Wars
Governors of the Province of New York
Colonial governors of New Jersey
Directors of New Netherland
People from Veere